is a passenger railway station  located in the town of Daisen, Tottori Prefecture, Japan. It is operated by the West Japan Railway Company (JR West).

Lines

Station layout
The station consists of one ground-level side platform and one ground level island platform. The station building faces the side platform, which is normally used for trains in both directions and the island platform is connected by a footbridge. It is the oldest station in the San'in area continuing to use the original station building from the opening of the line in 1902. In 2002, the station building was renovated to commemorate the 100th anniversary of the San'in Railway. Inside the station building is a display with a list of parcel fares from when the train was in service, photos of steam locomotives, and a chronological chart of the history of the San'in Main Line. The space that used to be the station office is now a direct sales store for local agricultural and marine products.The station building received protection by the national government as a Registered Tangible Cultural Property in 2017.

Platforms

History
Mikuriya Station opened on November 1, 1902. With the privatization of the Japan National Railways (JNR) on April 1, 1987, the station came under the aegis of the West Japan Railway Company.

Passenger statistics
In fiscal 2018, the station was used by an average of 234 passengers daily.

Surrounding area
 Daisen Town Hall
Japan National Route 9

See also
List of railway stations in Japan

References

External links 

 Mikuriya Station from JR-Odekake.net 

Railway stations in Tottori Prefecture
Stations of West Japan Railway Company
Sanin Main Line
Railway stations in Japan opened in 1902
Daisen, Tottori
Registered Tangible Cultural Properties